Venton Evans (born 19 June 1998) is a Jamaican footballer who plays as a defensive midfielder for Greenville Triumph in USL League One.

Career

Club

Portmore United
Evans started his career for Portmore United in Jamaica, winning two league titles.

UWI FC

In January 2020, Evans was transferred to UWI FC.

Fort Lauderdale CF
Evans signed with USL League One side Fort Lauderdale CF ahead of their 2021 season. He made his debut on 24 April 2021, start and scoring in a 4–2 loss to North Texas SC.

Greenville Trimph
On 23 December 2021, Evans signed with USL League One side Greenville Triumph ahead of their 2022 season.

International
Evans was called up to the u22 olympic national team in 2019.

Honors
Jamaica National Premier League: 2
2017–18, 2018–19

CFU Club Championship: 1 
2019 CFU Club Champion

References

1998 births
Living people
Association football midfielders
Portmore United F.C. players
UWI F.C. players
Inter Miami CF II players
Greenville Triumph SC players
USL League One players
Jamaican footballers
Jamaican expatriate footballers
Jamaican expatriate sportspeople in the United States
Expatriate soccer players in the United States
Sportspeople from Kingston, Jamaica